Kirkfield/Balsam Lake (Erlandson) Water Aerodrome  is located  east of Kirkfield on Balsam Lake, Ontario, Canada.

References

Registered aerodromes in Ontario
Seaplane bases in Ontario